Ursula K. Le Guin (1929–2018) was an American author of speculative fiction, realistic fiction, non-fiction, screenplays, librettos, essays, poetry, speeches, translations, literary critiques, chapbooks, and children's fiction. She was primarily known for her works of speculative fiction. These include works set in the fictional world of Earthsea, stories in the Hainish Cycle, and standalone novels and short stories. Though frequently referred to as an author of science fiction, critics have described her work as being difficult to classify.

Le Guin came to critical attention with the publication of A Wizard of Earthsea in 1968, and The Left Hand of Darkness in 1969. The Earthsea books, of which A Wizard of Earthsea was the first, have been described as Le Guin's best work by several commentators, while scholar Charlotte Spivack described The Left Hand of Darkness as having established Le Guin's reputation as a writer of science fiction. Literary critic Harold Bloom referred to the books as Le Guin's masterpieces. Several scholars have called the Earthsea books Le Guin's best work. Her work has received intense critical attention. As of 1999, ten volumes of literary criticism and forty dissertations had been written about her work: she was referred to by scholar Donna White as a "major figure in American letters". Her awards include the National Book Award, the Newbery Medal, and multiple Hugo and Nebula Awards. Feminist critiques of her writing were particularly influential upon Le Guin's later work. 

Le Guin's first published work was the poem "Folksong from the Montayna Province" in 1959, while her first short story was "An die Musik", in 1961; both were set in her fictional country of Orsinia. Her first professional publication was the short story "April in Paris" in 1962, while her first published novel was Rocannon's World, released by Ace Books in 1966. Her final publications included the non-fiction collections Dreams Must Explain Themselves and Ursula K Le Guin: Conversations on Writing, and the poetry volume So Far So Good: Final Poems 2014–2018, all of which were released after her death. This bibliography includes all of Le Guin's published novels, short fiction, translations, and edited volumes, and all collections that include material not previously published in book form, as well as any works mentioned in commentary about Le Guin's writings.

Fiction and poetry

Non-fiction

Edited volumes

Translations

References

Sources

 
 
 
 
 
 
 
 
 
 
 
 
 

Le Guin, Ursula K.
Bibliographies of American writers
Science fiction bibliographies
Fantasy bibliographies